Kumaraswamy s/o Duraisamy Pillay (11 March 1906 – 29 May 1972) was a Hindu reformer and Tamil community leader in Indonesia. He started the Deli Hindu Sabah, the Indian Boy Scout Association and many other projects benefitting the Hindu Tamil communities of Medan. He died in May 1972 in Medan.

References

Sources
A Mani, Kernial Singh Sandhu. Indian Communities in Southeast Asia. Institute of Southeast Asian Studies, 2006. 

1906 births
1979 deaths
20th-century Hindu religious leaders
Hindu revivalists
Indonesian Hindu religious leaders
Malaysian emigrants to Indonesia
Indonesian people of Indian descent
Indonesian people of Tamil descent
People from Medan